Eight on the Lam is a 1967 American comedy film directed by George Marshall. It stars Bob Hope and Phyllis Diller.

Plot
Bank teller Henry Dimsdale (Bob Hope) finds ten $1,000 bills. He is a widower with seven kids and could use the money, and housekeeper Golda (Phyllis Diller) tells him it's a case of finders keepers.

Henry waits two weeks to see if anyone claims the missing money. No one does, so he splurges on a new car and a diamond ring for Ellie Barton (Shirley Eaton), his fiancee. But when the bank discovers a $50,000 shortage, Henry becomes a prime suspect. He, his family and Ellie take it on the lam to Arizona.

A detective, Jasper Lynch (Jonathan Winters), the boyfriend of Golda, is assigned to investigate. Henry's boss at the bank, Pomeroy (Austin Willis), is seen with a sexy younger woman, Monica (Jill St. John), who has expensive tastes. After a chase, Henry is placed under arrest. His kids hide a tape recorder in Pomeroy's pocket, though, and get an admission of guilt. That frees their dad to marry Ellie while the helpful Golda and Jasper do likewise.

Cast
 Bob Hope as Henry Dimsdale 
 Phyllis Diller as Golda 
 Jonathan Winters as Police Sgt. Jasper Lynch / Mother Lynch 
 Shirley Eaton as Ellie Barton
 Jill St. John as Monica
 Stacey Gregg as Linda (credited as Stacey Maxwell)
 Kevin Brodie as Steve
 Robert Hope as Mike
 Glenn Gilger as Andy
 Avis Hope as Dana
 Debi Storm as Lois
 Michael Freeman as Mark
 Austin Willis as Mr. Pomeroy
 Peter Leeds as Marty
 Charles Lane as Bank Examiner 
 Robert Foulk as Detective 
 Jonathan Hole as Jewelry Salesman

See also
 List of American films of 1967

References

External links
 
 
 
 

1967 films
1960s crime comedy films
American crime comedy films
Films directed by George Marshall
United Artists films
1967 comedy films
1960s English-language films
1960s American films
English-language crime comedy films